The 3rd Critics' Choice Documentary Awards were presented on November 11, 2018, in Brooklyn, New York, honoring the finest achievements in documentary filmmaking and non-fiction television. The nominees were announced in October 15, 2018 with Free Solo leading the nominations with six.

Special awards
At the ceremony, filmmaker Stanley Nelson was presented with the Critics' Choice Impact Award while director Michael Moore received the Critics' Choice Lifetime Achievement Award.

Winners and nominees

Films by multiple nominations and wins

The following films received multiple nominations:

The following films received multiple awards:

See also
91st Academy Awards
71st Primetime Creative Arts Emmy Awards

References

2018 film awards
Critics' Choice Documentary Awards